Institute of Child Health is a hospital in Kolkata, India offering post-graduate training in pediatrics under West Bengal University of Health Sciences. It has a distinction of being the first pediatric institute of India.

History
The Institute of Child Health was set up by Dr K.C. Chaudhuri, the doyen of Indian pediatrics, in Kolkata in 1956. Pandit Jawaharlal Nehru, the then Prime Minister, inaugurated the institute on 16 January 1957. It is the first pediatric institute of India.

References

Hospitals in Kolkata
Affiliates of West Bengal University of Health Sciences
Hospitals established in 1957
Educational institutions established in 1957
1957 establishments in West Bengal